Rockwell is a city in Cerro Gordo County, Iowa, United States. The population was 1,071 at the time of the 2020 census. It is part of the Mason City Micropolitan Statistical Area.

Geography
Rockwell, IA is located at  (42.984671, -93.190007).

Demographics

2010 census
As of the census of 2010, there were 1,039 people, 420 households, and 299 families living in the city. The racial makeup of the city was 98.6% White, 0.1% African American, 0.1% Asian, 0.1% from other races, and 1.2% from two or more races. Hispanic or Latino of any race were 1.6% of the population.

There were 420 households, of which 32.4% had children under the age of 18 living with them, 56.9% were married couples living together, 9.5% had a female householder with no husband present, 4.8% had a male householder with no wife present, and 28.8% were non-families. 25.2% of all households were made up of individuals, and 11.2% had someone living alone who was 65 years of age or older. The average household size was 2.39 and the average family size was 2.83.

The median age in the city was 41.7 years. 23.7% of residents were under the age of 18; 7.6% were between the ages of 18 and 24; 22.5% were from 25 to 44; 26.6% were from 45 to 64; and 19.7% were 65 years of age or older. The gender makeup of the city was 48.4% male and 51.6% female.

2000 census
As of the census of 2000, there were 989 people, 371 households, and 268 families living in the city. The racial makeup of the city was 97.88% White, 0.10% African American, 0.10% Native American, 0.20% Asian, 0.30% from other races, and 1.42% from two or more races. Hispanic or Latino of any race were 1.62% of the population.

There were 371 households, out of which 36.4% had children under the age of 18 living with them, 63.3% were married couples living together, 6.5% had a female householder with no husband present, and 27.5% were non-families. 25.1% of all households were made up of individuals, and 15.9% had someone living alone who was 65 years of age or older. The average household size was 2.54 and the average family size was 3.06.

In the city, the population was spread out, with 26.7% under the age of 18, 6.6% from 18 to 24, 22.0% from 25 to 44, 22.9% from 45 to 64, and 21.8% who were 65 years of age or older. The median age was 41 years. For every 100 females, there were 93.9 males. For every 100 females age 18 and over, there were 88.8 males.

The median income for a household in the city was $39,219, and the median income for a family was $47,167. Males had a median income of $31,522 versus $21,406 for females. The per capita income for the city was $16,491. About 4.2% of families and 6.8% of the population were below the poverty line, including 7.7% of those under age 18 and 15.5% of those age 65 or over.

Parks and recreation 

The city has two large parks, Zeidler Park and Linn Grove Campground, a camping area, a swimming pool, and the Linn Grove Golf Course.

Education 
Rockwell is part of the West Fork Community School District, formed in 2011 by the merger of the Rockwell–Swaledale Community School District and the SCMT (Sheffield–Chapin–Meservey–Thornton) Community School District. The Rockwell–Swaledale district was formed in 1960 by the merger of the Rockwell Community School District and the Swaledale Community School District.

It is home to the West Fork elementary school. The mascot for West Fork is the Warhawk, and the middle and high school is located in the neighboring town of Sheffield.

See also

 List of cities in Iowa

References

External links

Cities in Cerro Gordo County, Iowa
Cities in Iowa
Mason City, Iowa micropolitan area